Santo Stefano del Sole is a town and comune in the province of Avellino, in the Campania region of southern Italy.
 
The town is bordered by Atripalda, Cesinali, San Michele di Serino, Santa Lucia di Serino, Serino, Sorbo Serpico and Volturara Irpina.

References

Cities and towns in Campania